A Severa is a Portuguese 1931 film, directed by Leitão de Barros, famous for being the first Portuguese all-talking sound film, a biopic of the  fado singer Maria Severa Onofriana, known as A Severa, based on the play by Júlio Dantas.

Cast
 Dina Teresa as Maria Severa Orofriana dita A Severa
 António Luis Lopes as Dom João, Count of Marialva
 Antonio Lavradio (D. António de Almeida Portugal, 10th Count of Avintes) as Dom José
 Ribeiro Lopes as Judge
 Silvestre Alegrim as Timpanas, Coach Driver
 Costinha as Marquis of Seide (as Augusto Costa)
 Antonio Fagim as Romão, Landlord
 Patrício Álvares as Diogo
 Eduardo Dores as Gypsy
 Oliveira Martins as The Duke

Production
The film was shot in Paris.

Legacy
The film is rarely seen today, and doesn't have the popularity of other films of the 1930s, seen as the golden era of Portuguese cinema. Maria Severa Onofriana is often mentioned in fado songs today.

References

External links
 

Portuguese biographical drama films
1930s Portuguese-language films
Films based on Portuguese novels
Films set in Portugal
1931 films
Films directed by José Leitão de Barros
Portuguese black-and-white films
1930s biographical drama films
1931 drama films